The following is a list of Glow Up: Britain's Next Make-Up Star episodes. Glow Up aired its first series in 2019, followed by a second series in 2020. On 14 January 2021, it was announced that Glow Up had been renewed for a third series, which began airing on 20 April 2021. A fourth series began airing on 11 May 2022 on BBC 3, and iPlayer

Series overview

Episodes

Series 1 (2019)

Series 2 (2020)

Series 3 (2021)

Series 4 (2022) 

|
|
|
|-
|
|
|
|
|-
|
|
|
|
|}

References

External links
 List of Glow Up: Britain's Next Make-Up Star episodes at BBC Online

Lists of British reality television series episodes